Vermilion Partners Limited is an investment banking advisory firm with international operations. It advises businesses on mergers and acquisitions, joint ventures, restructuring or organic growth, including arranging private placements and debt packages, and also invests alongside its clients and in certain middle-market Chinese enterprises.

Offices
There are offices in Beijing, Shanghai, Shenzhen, Hong Kong, London and Munich.

Sectors
The firm covers the following sectors:
•	Auto, Electronics & Industrial
•	Consumer/Branded Goods
•	Financial Services
•	Healthcare
•	Media, Telecoms and Support Services
•	Natural Resources and Primary Industry, including Chemicals
•	Retail, Leisure and Real Estate

External links
Vermilion Homepage
GBCC Chairman

References

Investment banks in China